Clair Wills, is a British academic specialising in 20th-century British and Irish cultural history and literature. Since 2019, she has been King Edward VII Professor of English Literature at the University of Cambridge and a fellow of Murray Edwards College, Cambridge. After studying at the Somerville College, Oxford, she taught at the University of Essex and Queen Mary University of London. She was then Leonard L. Milberg ’53 Chair of Irish Letters at Princeton University from 2015 to 2019, before moving to Cambridge.

Honours
In 2016, Wills was elected an Honorary Member of the Royal Irish Academy (HonMRIA). In July 2020, she was elected a Fellow of the British Academy (FBA), the United Kingdom's national academy for the humanities and social sciences.

In 2008, Wills was awarded the Hessell-Tiltman Prize for her book That Neutral Island (2007). In 2018, she was shortlisted for the Orwell Prize for her book Lovers and Strangers: An Immigrant History of Post-War Britain (2017).

Selected works

References

 

 
 

Year of birth missing (living people)
Living people
20th-century British non-fiction writers
20th-century British women writers
21st-century British non-fiction writers
21st-century British women writers
Academics of Queen Mary University of London
Academics of the University of Essex
Cultural historians
Alumni of Somerville College, Oxford
Fellows of Murray Edwards College, Cambridge
Fellows of the British Academy
Honorary Members of the Royal Irish Academy
King Edward VII Professors of English Literature
Literary historians
Princeton University faculty